Jullienula is a genus of bryozoans belonging to the family Cribrilinidae.

The species of this genus are found in North America.

Species:

Jullienula erinae 
Jullienula hippocrepis 
Jullienula kaigarabashiensis

References

Bryozoan genera